Cocculinida is an order of deepwater limpets (marine gastropods), in the subclass Neomphaliones.

Taxonomy
According to revised taxonomy of the Gastropoda by Bouchet & Rocroi et al. 2017, this order consists only of the superfamily Cocculinoidea Dall, 1882

References

 Haszprunar, G. (1987). Anatomy and affinities of Cocculinid limpets. Mollusca, Archeogastropoda). Zoologica Scripta 16: 305-324
 Haszprunar G. (1988). Anatomy and affinities of Pseudococculinid limpets (Mollusca, Archeogastropoda). Zoologica Scripta, 17(2): 161-179
 Marshall B. A. (1986). Recent and Tertiary Cocculinidae and Pseudococculinidae (Mollusca: Gastropoda) from New Zealand and New South Wales. New Zealand Journal of Zoology 12: 505-546

External links

Neomphaliones